BAG family molecular chaperone regulator 2 is a protein that in humans is encoded by the BAG2 gene.

BAG proteins compete with Hip for binding to the Hsc70/Hsp70 ATPase domain and promote substrate release. All the BAG proteins have an approximately 45-amino acid BAG domain near the C terminus but differ markedly in their N-terminal regions. The predicted BAG2 protein contains 211 amino acids. The BAG domains of BAG1, BAG2, and BAG3 interact specifically with the Hsc70 ATPase domain in vitro and in mammalian cells. All 3 proteins bind with high affinity to the ATPase domain of Hsc70 and inhibit its chaperone activity in a Hip-repressible manner.

Interactions
BAG2 has been shown to interact with HSPA8.

References

External links

Further reading